A list of films produced in Portugal in the 2010s, ordered by year of release. For an alphabetical list of Portuguese films see :Category:Portuguese films.

2010
List of Portuguese films of 2010

2011
 List of Portuguese films of 2011

2012
List of Portuguese films of 2012

2013
List of Portuguese films of 2013

2014
List of Portuguese films of 2014

2015
List of Portuguese films of 2015

2016
List of Portuguese films of 2016

2017
List of Portuguese films of 2017

2018
List of Portuguese films of 2018

2019
List of Portuguese films of 2019

TBA

References

External links
 Portuguese film at the Internet Movie Database

Films
Portuguese